Punnai Nallur is a village in the Thanjavur taluk of Thanjavur district, Tamil Nadu, India. The temple of goddess Punnainallur Mariamman is located in the outskirts of Thanjavur in the Thanjavur District.

Demographics 

As per the 2001 census, Pinnai Nallur had a total population of 5442 with 2700 males and 2742 females. The sex ratio was 1016. The literacy rate was 80.98.

Landmark
 Punnainallur Mariamman Temple is located 5 km from Thanjavur Old Bus stand.

References 

 

Villages in Thanjavur district